Eatoniella strebeli is a species of minute sea snail, a marine gastropod mollusk in the family Eatoniellidae, the eatoniellids.

Distribution

Description 
The maximum recorded shell length is 1.72 mm.

Habitat 
Minimum recorded depth is 15 m. Maximum recorded depth is 137 m.

References

External links

Eatoniellidae
Gastropods described in 1994
Taxa named by Winston Ponder